{{DISPLAYTITLE:C13H17N}}
The molecular formula C13H17N (molar mass: 187.28 g/mol, exact mass: 187.1361 u) may refer to:

 D-Deprenyl, also known as dextro-N-propargyl-N-methylamphetamine
 Selegiline (L-deprenyl)